Tactical Nav (stylized as Tactical NAV) is a location-based tracking app designed for use by military personnel. The app is primarily designed to assist in identifying targets, pinpointing enemy fire and mapping waypoints.

Overview 
The app allows users to pinpoint enemy fire and identify targets using their mobile phone's camera, the Military Grid Reference System (MGRS) and the GPS. The app is used to direct mortar and artillery fire. It is also used in close combat and close air support operations. Information gathered by the app can be sent to a tactical operations center, where a decision is made to conduct an airstrike or provide medical evacuation to wounded troops. Waypoint and location data can be shared via Facebook, text and email.

The app allows includes features designed to make its use less conspicuous, such as a red-light user interface which conceals light from the phone's screen at night.

History 
Tactical NAV was designed by U.S. Army Captain Jonathan J. Springer, a former Battalion Fire Support Officer in the 101st Airborne Division. Springer conceived the idea for the app while on his third tour in Afghanistan in support of Operation Enduring Freedom. After a rocket attack by the Taliban killed two soldiers in his battalion, he was inspired to create an app that would prevent similar losses from occurring in the future.

Springer founded Tactical NAV, LLC (formerly AppDaddy) in 2010 to develop mobile applications for use by military personnel. Springer tested the app in combat situations during his service in eastern Afghanistan. The app was released on the App Store on February 14, 2011. As of 2012, the app had been downloaded 8,000 times by members of the United States Armed Forces, Canadian Armed Forces and Australian Defence Force.

As of December 2021, the app is available on both iOS and Android.

References 

Geographic data and information software
Mobile applications
Mobile route-planning software